St Columba's Church, Burtonport is a Catholic church which serves the coastal village of Burtonport in County Donegal, Ireland.

The church was built in 1898–1899. It was the second church built in the parish after St Mary's in Belcruit, 1856. St. Mary's had a permanent curate until 2004 and both mainland churches are now served by one parish priest.

The third church of the parish, St. Crone's, is on Arranmore Island. Fr. John Boyce is the curate.

Fr. Dan McDyer added the sacristy during his tenure.

Fr. Dan O’Doherty added the bell tower in 1999 to mark the new millennium.

The old parochial house sat where St. Columba's Community Centre is now situated and housed a Parish priest and a curate. The new parochial house was built in 1985 by Fr. Dan McDyer. The parish belongs to the Diocese of Raphoe.

References

Churches completed in 1899
Roman Catholic churches in County Donegal
19th-century churches in the Republic of Ireland